Julian Ferdinand Stefani  (born 1939) is a former Australian politician.

Before entering politics, he was a managing director. In 1988 he was elected to the South Australian Legislative Council as a Liberal member. He held his seat until his retirement in 2006.

He was made a  Member of the Order of Australia in 2017.

References

1939 births
Living people
Liberal Party of Australia members of the Parliament of South Australia
Members of the South Australian Legislative Council
Recipients of the Medal of the Order of Australia
Members of the Order of Australia
21st-century Australian politicians